Jovine is a surname. Notable people with the surname include: 

Francesco Jovine (1902–1950), Italian writer and journalist
Gilda Jovine (born 1981), Dominican beauty pageant titleholder, actress and model
Marcel Jovine (1921-2003), American sculptor

See also
Iovine